Mermaid Man and Barnacle Boy are a duo of fictional characters in the American animated television series, SpongeBob SquarePants. They were respectively voiced by guest stars Ernest Borgnine and Tim Conway, who both previously starred in the 1960s sitcom McHale's Navy. Mermaid Man and Barnacle Boy first appeared in the eponymous season one episode that premiered on August21, 1999, and have since been featured as recurring characters. Following Borgnine and Conway's deaths in 2012 and 2019 respectively, the characters have been relegated to non-speaking cameos after creator Stephen Hillenburg requested not to recast the characters.

Mermaid Man and Barnacle Boy are two elderly superheroes who live in a retirement home and are stars of SpongeBob and Patrick's favorite television show. Mermaid Man appears to suffer from memory loss and yells a prolonged "evil!" whenever he hears the word, while Barnacle Boy seems to be the more sensible and more irritable of the two. They are among the few humans who can breathe underwater and speak to the inhabitants of Bikini Bottom.

Role in SpongeBob SquarePants
Mermaid Man and Barnacle Boy are semi-retired superheroes in the fictional city of Bikini Bottom. They are among the few humans who can breathe underwater and speak to the inhabitants of Bikini Bottom. Within the show's fictional universe, they are real superheroes. In addition to fighting crime, the duo has been extensively franchised throughout Bikini Bottom, including the television series The Adventures of Mermaid Man and Barnacle Boy, a long-running comic book series, trading cards, and kids' meals at the Krusty Krab. Mermaid Man and Barnacle Boy currently reside at Shady Shoals Retirement Home. However, their two biggest fans, SpongeBob SquarePants and Patrick Star, convince them to come out of retirement in their first appearance.

Mermaid Man

Mermaid Man is portrayed as a stereotypically senile elder, and appears to suffer from slight memory loss as he is easily confused by others' behavior, though this also could be partly credited to his hearing loss. As a young adult, Mermaid Man had a muscular, athletic build, but the elderly Mermaid Man is overweight and out of shape. As opposed to his sidekick, Barnacle Boy, he is slightly less grouchy and somewhat more tolerant of SpongeBob's ecstatic optimism, but only to a certain extent as SpongeBob's slips or mistakes have triggered serious consequences before in the past, and his partner seems annoyed with Mermaid Man's absentminded tendencies. Despite this, Mermaid Man has maintained some of his abilities as a skilled crime-fighter, though some of them have been comically shifted to reflect stereotypes commonly associated with his age; however, few of his admirers seem particularly bothered by this.

The episode "Mermaid Man Begins" reveals that, through a series of meticulous and intricate events, he and his friend were suddenly equipped with aquatically themed superpowers when they left the microwave on long which made it become radioactive which is what gave them their superpowers. They then chose to dedicate their lives to brawling undersea crime as a result (it is implied that the backstory behind the duo's powers as described in Bikini Bottom media was in fact far different from the presumably actual backstory Mermaid Man and Barnacle Boy remembered from differing perspectives).. Out of the three different stories Mermaid Man gave, it is revealed that the story of them eating radioactive popcorn was correct. His real name is Ernie.

Barnacle Boy
Barnacle Boy is depicted as being the undercredited and underappreciated younger sidekick of Mermaid Man. Grumpy and slightly ill-tempered, Barnacle Boy is notable for his brooding, moody disposition and exasperation with his partner's absentminded behavior as a result of old age, and even into his golden years, Barnacle Boy is still treated in a juvenile fashion, coddled in an infantile way. In his later years, he slightly resembles Squidward Tentacles. He has largely maintained his nondescript slender physique over time. In the video game SpongeBob SquarePants: Battle for Bikini Bottom, Barnacle Boy has a son, a daughter-in-law, and four grandchildren which he notes to be his son's "four screaming children". His real name is Tim.

Development

Voice
Series creator Hillenburg described the guest appearances of Ernest Borgnine and Tim Conway as "so fantastic." He said "From the very beginning, the first real guest stars were [Ernest] Borgnine and [Tim] Conway[...] When you have a guest artist, you don't know how it's going to turn out. But Borgnine is the most animated guy on the planet."

According to casting supervisor Jennie Monica Hammond, Hillenburg and Derek Drymon, the show's creative director, already knew that they wanted Borgnine and Conway to provide the voices when they were voice casting for Mermaid Man and Barnacle Boy. They were on top of the list of actors they wanted to cast, and Hillenburg and Drymon were known to like them from their roles in McHale's Navy. Hillenburg and Drymon directly approached Borgnine and Conway, and the actors both accepted.

Mermaid Man

On casting the voice for Mermaid Man, Borgnine's voice cracked when he was giving the "EVIL!" voice. In an interview with the Archive of American Television, Borgnine said "By golly! We started something... and we kept it [the voice] in." Borgnine described the voice-over as it is like "stealing money" whereas "your voice becomes the actor... you make that character come alive through your voice."

On July 8, 2012, Borgnine died of kidney failure at the age of 95. Nickelodeon honored him with a two-hour SpongeBob SquarePants marathon featuring episodes focused upon his character.

The young Mermaid Man was voiced by Tom Kenny in the first season episode "Mermaid Man and Barnacle Boy," and by Adam West in the seventh season episode "Back to the Past."

Joe Whyte voiced Mermaid Man for the video games SpongeBob SquarePants: Employee of the Month and SpongeBob SquarePants: Battle for Bikini Bottom. Joe Alaskey voiced Mermaid Man for the video games SpongeBob SquarePants: Lights, Camera, Pants! and SpongeBob SquarePants: Creature from the Krusty Krab. After Ernest Borgnine's death, he was replaced by Enn Reitel for the mobile app SpongeBob Moves in.

The character has appeared on the series in the years since Borgnine's death, but has been limited to non-speaking roles. In the 2016 episode "Mermaid Pants", SpongeBob dresses up in a Mermaid Man costume to play with Patrick.

Barnacle Boy
Barnacle Boy was voiced by Conway, who co-starred with Borgnine in the sitcom McHale's Navy. In 2010, Burt Ward guest starred as the young Barnacle Boy in the episode "Back to the Past". As with Mermaid Man, Barnacle Boy's appearances were reduced to non-speaking roles or portrayal by other characters (generally Patrick Star) since Borgnine's death.

On September 27, 2018, SpongeBob showrunner Vincent Waller confirmed that Conway would not reprise his role as Barnacle Boy again. Waller stated:
 Conway died of normal pressure hydrocephalus at the age of 85 on May 14, 2019.

References

Animated duos
Animated human characters
Television characters introduced in 1999
Animated characters introduced in 1999
Fictional characters with memory disorders
Fictional characters with superhuman strength
Fictional characters with water abilities
Fictional undersea characters
Male characters in animated series
Parody superheroes
SpongeBob SquarePants characters
Fictional mutants
Fictional genetically engineered characters
Superhero duos